Meyers Nunatak is a nunatak located  east-southeast of Mount Manthe, at the southeast end of the Hudson Mountains in Antarctica. It was mapped by United States Geological Survey from surveys and U.S. Navy air photos, 1960–66, and was named by the Advisory Committee on Antarctic Names for Herbert Meyers, a United States Antarctic Research Program geomagnetist at Byrd Station in 1960–61.

References

Hudson Mountains
Nunataks of Ellsworth Land
Volcanoes of Ellsworth Land